The Fuqua School of Business (pronounced ) is the business school of Duke University, a private research university in Durham, North Carolina. It enrolls more than 1,300 students in degree-seeking programs. Duke Executive Education also offers non-degree business education and professional development programs. Its MBA program was ranked the 9th best business school in the US by The Economist in 2019, and 13th in the US by The Financial Times in 2022.

History

Formed in 1969, the Graduate School of Business Administration enrolled its first class of 20 students in 1970. In 1974, Thomas F. Keller, a 1953 Duke graduate, became the graduate school's new dean. In three years, Keller's capital campaign raised $24 million, $10 million of which came from businessman and philanthropist J. B. Fuqua. The graduate school's name was then changed to The Fuqua School of Business.

J. B. Fuqua was raised by his grandparents on a tobacco farm in Prince Edward County, Virginia. Fuqua began his relationship with Duke University when he borrowed books by mail from the Duke library. J. B. Fuqua's cumulative giving to Duke was nearly $40 million at the time of his death on April 5, 2006.

In September 2008, Fuqua launched an expansion initiative to establish offices in St. Petersburg, Russia; Dubai, United Arab Emirates; Shanghai/Kunshan, China; New Delhi, India; and London, England.

Admissions

For the Daytime MBA Class of 2019, Fuqua had a 22% acceptance rate with 3,796 applications received. Approximately half of those accepted into the MBA program enrolled to fill a class of 439. The median GMAT score was 710. Fuqua reports an 80% GMAT range of 660–750, with 39% international and 34% female students.

Academics
The school's faculty is organized into ten disciplines, including Accounting, Marketing, Decision Sciences, Economics, Finance, Management, Health Sector Management, Management Communication, Operations Management, and Strategy. The faculty was ranked number one in the US by BusinessWeek (Intellectual Capital) in 2010 and 2012.

While working at Duke University, former Professor Robert E. Whaley developed the Chicago Board Options Exchange Volatility Index (ticker symbol: VIX), a measure of the implied market volatility. Another notable faculty member is Dan Ariely, an Israeli-American professor of psychology and behavioral economics.

Joint degrees

The Duke MBA offers several joint degree programs in conjunction with other graduate and professional programs at Duke. These programs allow students to earn two degrees in less time than if they pursued the two separately. Joint degrees are offered with Duke University School of Medicine, Duke University School of Law, Nicholas School of the Environment and Earth Sciences, Sanford School of Public Policy, and the Duke University School of Nursing.

Careers
Poets&Quants 2020 ranking of MBA compensation indicated that Fuqua ranked 11th in the US for Average Starting Pay (Salary + Bonus) at a total of $161,079. 
Additionally, Fuqua's MBA program ranked 8th in the US for the percentage of students who had jobs 3 months after graduating.

For the graduating, full-time MBA Class of 2019, the top five hiring companies include: McKinsey & Co. (45), Amazon (38), BCG (37), Microsoft (23), Dell
(18), and Google (18).

Research centers
Research centers at The Fuqua School of Business further specific academic interests of the business school. Such research centers include:

The Fuqua/Coach K Center of Leadership & Ethics (COLE) – COLE was established as a collaboration between Fuqua, Duke Athletics and The Kenan Institute for Ethics to advance leadership through research and education.
Center for the Advancement of Social Entrepreneurship (CASE) – The center promotes innovative and entrepreneurial approaches to improving social conditions through education and research.
Center of Entrepreneurship and Innovation (CEI) – Fuqua created this center to advance scholarship in the areas of entrepreneurship and innovation, with the goal of creating one of the top environments for students interested in entrepreneurship.
Center for Energy, Development and the Global Environment (EDGE) – EDGE pursues education, research, and outreach focusing on two primary topical areas: Global Energy and Corporate Sustainability.
Center for Financial Excellence – The Center for Financial Excellence supports financial research and education at Duke, with particular emphasis on strengthening relationships between faculty, students, and finance professionals.

Buildings
Fuqua School of Business spans several buildings. They include:
Thomas F. Keller Center has several classrooms and support offices and was named for former Dean Thomas F. Keller.
 Wesley Alexander Magat Academic Center was built in 1999. The majority of faculty offices and smaller meeting rooms are located here.
 Lafe P. and Rita D. Fox Student Center has a student lounge, dining facilities, student communications center, and additional office space.
 Breeden Hall was named in honor of Dean Douglas Breeden and his wife Josie. It was built in 2008 and holds classrooms and auditoriums, the Ford Library, team rooms, meeting space, and MBA admissions and operations offices.
 JB Duke Hotel opened in 2017 and includes the R. David Thomas Executive Conference Center, and guest rooms and suites.

Notable alumni

 John A. Allison IV (M.B.A. 1974), head of the Cato Institute; former chairman and CEO, BB&T
 Jack O. Bovender Jr. (M.H.A. 1969), former chairman and CEO, HCA
 Jonathan Browning (Global Executive M.B.A. 1997) former U.S. CEO, Volkswagen Group of America
 Jessica Faye Carter (J.D. 2002, M.B.A. 2002), author, columnist, social media entrepreneur
 Tim Cook ( M.B.A. 1988), CEO, Apple Inc.
 Lennie Friedman (M.B.A. 2011), NFL offensive lineman
 Melinda Gates (A.B. 1986, M.B.A. 1987), co-founder, Bill and Melinda Gates Foundation
 Pat Garrity, (M.B.A. 2011), former NBA basketball player; assistant general manager, Detroit Pistons
 David Gibbs, (M.B.A. 1988), former CEO, Pizza Hut; CEO, Yum! Brands
 Brian Hamilton (M.B.A. 1990), co-founder and former chairman, Sageworks; founder Inmates to Entrepreneurs
 W. Bruce Johnson (B.A., J.D., M.B.A. 1977), interim CEO and president, Sears Holdings Corporation
 L. Kevin Kelly (Executive M.B.A. 1999), CEO of Heidrick & Struggles
 Michael Lamach (MS, Global Executive M.B.A. 2001), president, chairman, and CEO, Ingersoll Rand
 Alison Levine (M.B.A. 2000), Mount Everest climber, author (On the Edge); documentary executive producer (The Glass Ceiling)
 Ron Nicol (M.B.A. 1986), Senior Partner and Managing Director, Boston Consulting Group
Hilda Pinnix-Ragland (M.B.A. 1986), Vice President of Corporate Public Affairs at Duke Energy
 Namita Thapar (M.B.A. 2001), Executive Director, Emcure Pharmaceuticals
 Christian Van Thillo (M.B.A. 1989), CEO, De Persgroep
 Brett Velicovich, (M.B.A. 2012), FoxNews contributor and former United States Army intelligence.

See also
List of United States business school rankings
List of business schools in the United States
List of Atlantic Coast Conference business schools

References

External links
Official website

Business schools in North Carolina
Duke University
Educational institutions established in 1969
1969 establishments in North Carolina
Duke University campus